Lee Seung-hyeop (born 15 April 1971) is a South Korean footballer.

Club career
He joined Ulsan Hyundai Horangi in 1993

He joined Busan Daewoo Royals in 2000.

International career
He was part of the  South Korea squad at the 1992 Olympics tournament.

References

External links 

1970 births
Living people
South Korean footballers
South Korea international footballers
Ulsan Hyundai FC players
Busan IPark players
K League 1 players
Olympic footballers of South Korea
Footballers at the 1992 Summer Olympics
Place of birth missing (living people)
Association football defenders